Alejandro Marco-Buhrmester, previously also Alexander Marco-Buhrmester (born 1964) is a German operatic baritone.

Life 

This was followed by permanent engagements at the Aalto-Theater Essen (1989-1992) and the Theater Dortmund (1992-1995), where he sang roles such as Papageno, Guglielmo, Jeletzky (alongside Martha Mödl), Danilo, Marcello and Sharpless. In 1995, Harry Kupfer invited him to join the ensemble of the Komische Oper Berlin, where he was a permanent member until 1999 and then sang roles such as Dr. Falke, Harlequin, Dandini and Barber as a guest until 2005. Since 1999, Marco-Buhrmester is a freelance artist.

Since then he has been a guest at the Bielefeld Theatre as Lindorf/Coppélius/Miracle/Dapertutto (the Tales of Hoffmann),  Conte di Luna (Il trovatore),  Enrico (Lucia di Lammermoor), the title role in Nabucco and Peter Besenbinder (Hänsel and Gretel) and in the musical Kiss Me, Kate as Fred/Petrucchio, as Galileo Galilei in the world premiere of William Wart Murta's Starry Messenger or as Tony in West Side Story. He has also sung at the Saarländisches Staatstheater and Wiesbaden, the Mannheim Theatre, the Bonn Opera, the Deutsche Oper Berlin, the Lucerne International Festival, the Bergen Festival (Norway), the Latvian National Opera in Riga and the Oper Frankfurt].

Marco-Buhrmester debuted in Bayreuth in 2001 in Die Meistersinger von Nürnberg, the last production of Wolfgang Wagner under the musical direction of Christian Thielemann. In 2002, he sang there, also under Christian Thielemann, in Tannhäuser, In 2004, he took over the role of Amfortas in Christoph Schlingensief's Parsifal conducted by Pierre Boulez. In 2006, he made his debut in Bayreuth as Gunther in Götterdämmerung, again conducted by Christian Thielemann. He also sang at the Paris Opéra Bastille in 2005 as Melot in Peter Sellars' production of Tristan und Isolde under the direction of Esa-Pekka Salonen and then in the same production as Kurwenal under Valery Gergiev.

Since the 2017/18 season, Marco-Buhrmester has been a permanent member of the Staatstheater Augsburg.

Repertoire 
 Giorgio Germont – La traviata
 Miller – Luisa Miller
 Amfortas – Parsifal
 Conte Almaviva – The Marriage of Figaro
 Kurwenal – Tristan und Isolde

Recordings 
 Capriccio 2001 (Der Protagonist by Kurt Weill)
 Capriccio 2004 (La celebre Natività del Redentore by Antonio Casimir Cartellieri)

References

External links 
 

German operatic baritones
1964 births
Living people
Musicians from Basel-Stadt
20th-century German male  opera singers
21st-century German  male opera singers